Jonathan Kaufman (born April 18, 1956) is a Pulitzer Prize winning reporter and author, and Director of the Northeastern University School of Journalism and professor of Journalism.

Kaufman was born in New York City, New York. Prior to joining Northeastern, he was an Executive Editor at Bloomberg News, overseeing more than 300 reporters and editors. Under his leadership, Kaufman's team at Bloomberg won numerous awards including a 2015 Pulitzer Prize, several George Polk Awards, the Overseas Press Club Award, a Gerald Loeb Award, the Osborn Elliott Prize of the Asia Society, and the Education Writers Association Grand Prize.

Prior to Bloomberg, Kaufman was  a senior editor and Beijing Bureau Chief at The Wall Street Journal and a reporter and Berlin Bureau Chief at the Boston Globe where he was part of a team that won a Pulitzer Prize for a series examining racism and job discrimination in Boston.

Kaufman's specialties are the role of Jews in American politics and around the world; the challenges facing media in the 21st century and in the age of President Donald Trump; race relations and class in the United States; and Chinese politics, economy  and relations with the United States.

Author

Kaufman is the author of three books.

Broken Alliance:  The Turbulent Times Between Blacks and Jews in America won the National Jewish Book Award. It was hailed by African-American and white reviewers as gripping, insightful and fair and is still used widely in college classrooms.

A Hole in the Heart of the World: Being Jewish in Eastern Europe was a finalist for the National Jewish Book Award. Reviews called it “deeply engrossing,” and “beautifully written.”

Kaufman had a third book published 2020: Kings of Shanghai. Two Rival Dynasties and the Creation of Modern China (Little Brown, 2020).

Education
Masters: Regional Studies of East Asia, Harvard University
Bachelors: English, Yale College

Honors and awards
Pulitzer Prize for Special Local Reporting, 1984, for a series in The Boston Globe on racism and job discrimination in Boston.
Pulitzer Prize Finalist for Local Reporting, 1985, for a series in The Boston Globe on neighborhood activists in Boston.
National Jewish Book Award for Broken Alliance, 1989.
National Headliner Award, 1997, for a series in The Wall Street Journal on the changing nature of work and worker's lives.
Unity in Media Award, 1999, for articles in the Wall Street Journal on the impact of incarceration on black families.
American Jewish Committee Present Tense Award for Best Book on Current Affairs for Broken Alliance, 1989.
Finalist, National Jewish Book Award for A Hole in the Heart of the World, 1997.
Columbia University School of Journalism School Award for Coverage of Race and Ethnicity, 2008, for a portfolio of stories on how race and gender have impacted the presidential primary races.
Columbia University School of Journalism School Award for Coverage of Race and Ethnicity, 1999, for articles in the Wall Street Journal on the impact of incarceration on black families.
Pulitzer Prize for Explanatory Journalism, 2015, for a Bloomberg News series on corporate tax dodging.
Asia Society/Osborn Elliott Award for Coverage of Asia, 2015, for a Bloomberg series on companies in India killing villagers and others through pollution and environmental abuse.
Pulitzer Prize Finalist for Public Service, 2011, for a Bloomberg News series on financial abuses by for-profit colleges.
Overseas Press Club Award, 2011, for a Bloomberg Businessweek story on Chinese students gaming the SATs to gain admittance to American colleges.
Gerald Loeb Award, 2011, for a Bloomberg series on financial abuses by for-profit colleges.
George Polk Award, 2012, for a Bloomberg series on abuses in the student loan industry.
George Polk Award, 2011, for a Bloomberg series on financial abuses by for-profit colleges.

References

Northeastern University faculty
Yale College alumni
Harvard University alumni
Bloomberg L.P. people
The Wall Street Journal people
The Boston Globe people
20th-century American journalists
American male journalists
20th-century American male writers
21st-century American male writers
21st-century American journalists
1956 births
Living people
Pulitzer Prize for Local Reporting winners